Radio Rwanda (est. 1961) is a radio station of the Rwandan Broadcasting Agency (RBA), a public broadcaster that also owns Rwandan Television (RTV), Magic FM and other public radio stations.

Before the attack of the Rwandan Patriotic Front (FPR) on October 1st, 1990, Radio Rwanda was the only national radio station in Rwanda, which represented both the views of the state and that of the party in power.  Shortly after the start of the war, the FPR created its own radio station, Radio Muhabura.  

In March 1992, Radio Rwanda began to broadcast false information regarding the possible assassination of Hutu officials, after which many Tutsis were consequently killed in the Bugesera region. When the transitional government was installed in April 1992, it demanded a programming change of the radio by President Habyarimana.  This preserved the transitional government's role in the state radio, but stopped that of the President's party, the MRND.  Due to the growing influence of Radio Muhabura, radical Hutus created a new radio station in 1993, named Radio Télévision Libre des Mille Collines, abbreviated as RTLM.  RTLM frequently made hateful statements against the Tutsis, and several of its journalists were eventually convicted of inciting Genocide against the Tutsi.  Despite Radio Rwanda and RTLM being two distinct, independent radio stations, they were broadcast at the same wavelengths at different times, which led the population to confuse them. 

Radio Rwanda was reestablished between 1994 and 2000, with financing from the German government. 

Today Radio Rwanda has become a national Public radio with other 6 regional stations including Magic FM (Kigali), Radio Rusizi (Rusizi), Radio Musanze (Musanze), Radio Nyagatare (Nyagatare, Radio Rubavu (Rubavu) and Radio Huye (Huye). The current director is Aldo Havugimana.

In 2013, the singer Cécile Kayirebwa sued several Rwandan radio stations including Radio Rwanda. She noted that her music was frequently broadcast, but she had received no royalties.

See also
 Media of Rwanda

References

External links
Official website
 

Radio stations in Rwanda
1961 establishments in Rwanda
Radio stations established in 1961